This is a list of flags used in Barbados.

National flag

Governmental flags

Military flags

Historical flags

See also
Flag of the British Windward Islands
Flag of the West Indies Federation
National symbols of Barbados

External links
Flag of the Prime Minister of Barbados
Flag of the Governor-General of Barbados
History of Barbados
Colonial symbols of Barbados
Barbados Air Force roundel

 
Flags
Flags
Barbados